Havestar is the first EP by the Illinois-based industrial band I:Scintilla. It was released in 2006 on Alfa Matrix. The album contains three reworked songs from their first release, The Approach. These songs are also featured on their next full-length album, Optics. In addition, there are six remixes by various well-known artists within the genre.

Track listing
 "Havestar" - 04:44
 "Scin" - 04:35
 "The Bells" - 04:32
 "Capsella (Toxin Mix)" - 03:38
 "Havestar (Combichrist Mix)" - 04:43
 "Havestar (Diskonnekted Mix)" - 04:56
 "Havestar (Implant Mix)" - 04:36
 "Capsella (Klutae Mix)" - 06:41

References 

I:Scintilla albums
2006 EPs